Karabidayevka is a rural locality (a khutor) in Eltonskoye Rural Settlement, Pallasovsky District, Volgograd Oblast, Russia. The population was 93 as of 2010. There are 3 streets.

Geography 
Karabidayevka is located 11 km south-east from Elton, 124 km south of Pallasovka (the district's administrative centre) by road. Elton is the nearest rural locality.

References 

Rural localities in Pallasovsky District